Alix Cohen (born 1976) is a British philosopher and a Reader of Philosophy at the University of Edinburgh. She is known for her works on Kant's thought.
She is the current Co-Editor with Sacha Golob of the British Journal for the History of Philosophy.

Books
 Kant on the Human Sciences: Biology, Anthropology and History, Palgrave, 2009
 Thinking about the Emotions: A Philosophical History, co-editor with Bob Stern, OUP, 2017
 Kant on Emotions and Value (ed.), Palgrave, 2014
 Critical Guide to Kant’s Lectures on Anthropology (ed.), CUP, 2014
 Kant on Emotions, OUP, forthcoming

References

External links
Cohen at the University of Edinburgh

21st-century British philosophers
Philosophy academics
Living people
1976 births
Kant scholars
Academics of the University of Edinburgh
Alumni of the University of Cambridge